William Nzobazola better known by his stage name Ninho (born 2 April 1996) is a French rapper of Congolese descent.

Early life 
William Nzobazola grew up in Nemours, in Seine-et-Marne. His parents are Congolese. His father was Congolese singer Serge Kiambukuta. 

Ninho started rapping at the age of 12.

Career 
From 2013 to 2016, Ninho released three mixtapes: Ils sont pas au courant Vol. 1 (2013), En attendant I.S.P.A.C 2 (Ils sont pas au courant 2, 2014) and I.S.P.A.C 2 (2016).  

On 26 October 2016, he released M.I.L.S (Maintenant ils le savent) which is certified platinum.   

Ninho then released four studio albums: Comme prévu (2017), M.I.L.S 2.0 (2018), Destin (2019), M.I.L.S 3.0 (2020), Jefe (2021).  

In March 2021, Ninho became the French artist with the most certified singles, with 100 gold singles, 39 platinum singles, and 19 diamond singles.

Discography

Albums

Singles 

*Did not appear in the official Belgian Ultratop 50 charts, but rather in the bubbling under Ultratip charts.

Featured in

*Did not appear in the official Belgian Ultratop 50 charts, but rather in the bubbling under Ultratip charts.

Other charting songs

grand bain*Did not appear in the official Belgian Ultratop 50 charts, but rather in the bubbling under Ultratip charts.

References

French rappers
1996 births
Living people
French people of Democratic Republic of the Congo descent